Rožmberk nad Vltavou is a town in Český Krumlov District in the South Bohemian Region of the Czech Republic. It has about 400 inhabitants. The urban area with Rožmberk Castle is well preserved and is protected by law as an urban monument zone.

Administrative parts
The village of Přízeř is an administrative part of Rožmberk nad Vltavou.

Geography
Rožmberk nad Vltavou lies on the Vltava river in the Bohemian Forest Foothills.

History
Rožmberk was founded in the middle of the 13th century. It developed on a trade route from Český Krumlov to Linz in Austria. While owned by the Bohemian aristocratic Rosenberg family, it obtained town rights and grew in wealth. In 1620 the town became property of Charles Bonaventure, Count of Bucquoy.

Sights
Rožmberk nad Vltavou is most known for Rožmberk Castle. Apart from the castle, other sights list Church of Saint Nicholas (first mentioned in 1271, rebuilt in the Gothic style in the late 15th century) and burgher houses from the 17th–18th centuries on the town square.

Notable people
Sigismund Pirchan von Rosenberg (1389–1472), Catholic bishop
Otto Tumlirz (1890–1957), Austrian psychologist

Twin towns – sister cities

Rožmberk nad Vltavou is twinned with:
 Freistadt, Austria

Gallery

References

External links

Cities and towns in the Czech Republic
Populated places in Český Krumlov District